Diary is the second studio album by the collaboration of Mike Skinner and Robert Harvey as The D.O.T. It was released on 6 May 2013 by Cooking Vinyl Records.

Release
On 1 March 2013, it was announced the D.O.T. was releasing their second studio album Diary for release on 6 May 2013.

The first single "How We All Lie" was released on 4 March 2013.

The second single "Blood, Sweat and Tears" was released on 6 May 2013.

The third single "Left at the Lights" was released on 15 July 2013.

Critical reception
Diary was met with "mixed or average" reviews from critics. At Metacritic, which assigns a weighted average rating out of 100 to reviews from mainstream publications, this release received an average score of 54 based on 7 reviews.

In a review for AllMusic, critic reviewer Daniel Clancy wrote: "Diary features a wide array of styles, from the vibrant dance of "Wherever You May Be" to the indie pop of "Left at the Lights," but neither of those hit the right note and only serve as evidence that Skinner is perhaps spreading his ambitious production skills a little too thinly." Tomas Doyle of DIY said the release is "made to a high level of gloss and sheen but never feels over done, rather it revels in its layered orchestration which will leave those who are inclined to look discovering something new with each listen." At NME, Lucy Jones explained that Diary was "poorly produced" and some of the songs "sound like demos, or leftovers from their hugely disappointing 2012 debut album And That."

Track listing

References

External links
 
 

2013 albums
Albums produced by Mike Skinner (musician)
Cooking Vinyl albums